Sin City (also known as Frank Miller's Sin City) is a 2005 American neo-noir crime anthology film produced and directed by Frank Miller and Robert Rodriguez. It is based on Miller's graphic novel of the same name.

Much of the film is based on the first, third, and fourth books in Miller's original comic series. The Hard Goodbye is about an ex-convict who embarks on a rampage in search of his one-time sweetheart's killer. The Big Fat Kill follows a private investigator who gets caught in a street war between a group of prostitutes and a group of mercenaries, the police and the mob. That Yellow Bastard focuses on an aging police officer who protects a young woman from a grotesquely disfigured serial killer. The intro and outro of the film are based on the short story "The Customer is Always Right" which is collected in Booze, Broads & Bullets, the sixth book in the comic series.

The film stars an ensemble cast led by Jessica Alba, Benicio del Toro, Brittany Murphy, Clive Owen, Mickey Rourke, Bruce Willis, and Elijah Wood, and featuring Alexis Bledel, Powers Boothe, Michael Clarke Duncan, Rosario Dawson, Devon Aoki, Carla Gugino, Rutger Hauer, Jaime King, Michael Madsen, Nick Stahl, and Makenzie Vega among others.

Sin City opened to wide critical and commercial success, gathering particular recognition for the film's unique color processing which rendered most of the film in black and white while retaining or adding color for selected objects. The film was screened at the 2005 Cannes Film Festival in competition and won the Technical Grand Prize for the film's "visual shaping". A sequel also directed by Miller and Rodriguez was released in 2014, Sin City: A Dame to Kill For, but failed to match the critical and commercial success of its predecessor.

Plot

"The Customer Is Always Right (Part I)"
The Salesman walks onto a penthouse balcony where The Customer looks out over Basin City. He offers her a cigarette and says that she looks like someone who is tired of running and that he will save her. The two share a kiss and he shoots her; she dies in his arms. He says he will never know what she was running from but that he will cash her check in the morning.

"That Yellow Bastard (Part I)"
On the docks of Sin City, aging police officer John Hartigan tries to stop serial child-killer Roark Junior from raping and killing his fourth known victim, eleven-year-old Nancy Callahan. Junior is the son of Senator Roark, who has bribed Hartigan's corrupt partner, Bob, to cover up his son's crimes. Bob tries to convince Hartigan to walk away; Hartigan knocks him out.

Hartigan, fighting pain from a bad heart, heads into the warehouse where Roark Junior is holding Nancy. Hartigan confronts Junior and shoots off his ear, hand and genitals. Bob, now recovered, shoots Hartigan in the back. As the sirens approach, Bob leaves and Nancy lies down in Hartigan's lap. Hartigan passes out, reasoning his death is a fair trade for the girl's life.

"The Hard Goodbye"
After a one-night stand, Marv awakens to find Goldie has been killed while he slept. He flees the frame-up as the police arrive, vowing to avenge her death. His lesbian parole officer, Lucille, advises him to give up, for Marv may have imagined it all due to his "condition". Marv interrogates several informants, working up to a corrupt priest, who reveals that the Roark family was behind the murder. Marv kills the priest. As he leaves, Marv is attacked by a woman who looks like Goldie, which he dismisses as a hallucination.

Marv goes to the Roark family farm and is subdued by the silent stalker who killed Goldie. He awakens in the basement to find Lucille has been captured after looking into his story. She tells Marv that the killer is a cannibal named Kevin and that Goldie was a prostitute. They escape the basement, but Lucille is shot by a squad of corrupt cops. Marv kills the cops except for their leader, who reveals Cardinal Patrick Henry Roark arranged for Goldie's murder.

Marv goes to Old Town, Sin City's prostitute-run red-light district, to learn more about Goldie and is captured by her twin sister, Wendy. Once he convinces Wendy that he is not the killer, the two return to the farm where Marv traps and kills Kevin. He confronts Cardinal Roark, who confesses his part in the murders. Kevin was the cardinal's ward; the two men ate the prostitutes to "consume their souls". Marv kills the cardinal. He is then shot and captured by his guards.

Marv is nursed back to health. Corrupt cops threaten to kill his mother to get him to confess to killing Roark, Kevin and their victims. He is sentenced to death in the electric chair. Wendy visits him on death row and thanks him for avenging her sister. Marv is then executed.

"The Big Fat Kill"
Shellie is being harassed by her abusive ex-boyfriend Jackie Boy. Her boyfriend Dwight McCarthy violently warns him to leave Shellie alone. Jackie Boy and his cronies drunkenly drive to Old Town. Dwight follows and sees them harass Becky, a young prostitute. Gail, the prostitutes' leader and Dwight's on-and-off lover, also witnesses the scene. When Jackie Boy threatens Becky with a gun, Miho, a martial arts expert, kills Jackie Boy and his friends. They realize Jackie Boy is actually Detective Lieutenant Jack Rafferty of the Basin City Police, considered a "hero cop" by the press. If the cops learn how he died, their truce with the prostitutes would end and the mob would be free to wage war on Old Town.

Dwight takes the bodies to a tar pit, where he is ambushed by an ex-IRA mercenary hired by mob boss Wallenquist. He nearly drowns in the tar before Miho saves him. The mercenary flees to the sewer with Jackie Boy's severed head but Dwight and Miho retrieve it and return to Old Town. Meanwhile, mob enforcer Manute kidnaps Gail. Becky, threatened with the death of her mother, betrays the prostitutes. Manute prepares the mob's invasion of Old Town. Dwight trades Jackie Boy's head for Gail's freedom but the head is stuffed with explosives; Dwight detonates it, destroying the evidence and Gail's captors. The other prostitutes gun down the mercenaries while Becky, injured in the fight, escapes.

"That Yellow Bastard (Part II)"
Hartigan is recovering in a hospital when Senator Roark informs him that Junior is in a coma and the Roark legacy is in serious jeopardy. Hartigan will be framed for Junior's crimes; if he tells anyone the truth, his family will die. A grateful Nancy promises to write to him every week. Hartigan goes to jail, though he refuses to confess. He receives weekly letters from Nancy, as promised. After eight years, the letters stop and he receives a severed finger instead. Hartigan confesses to all charges, leading to his parole. He searches for an adult Nancy, not knowing he is being followed by a deformed, yellow man. He eventually finds her at Kadie's Bar, where she has become an exotic dancer.

Hartigan realizes he was set up to lead "them" to Nancy and the two drive away in her car, unaware of the man hiding in the trunk. As they hide in a motel, Nancy confesses her love for Hartigan, who is unable to reciprocate her feelings. The deformed man ambushes Hartigan and reveals himself as Roark Junior, disfigured by years of treatment to regenerate his body parts. Junior hangs Hartigan and takes Nancy away. Hartigan escapes and tracks down Junior to the Roark farm. He fakes a heart attack, causing Junior to lower his guard. He castrates Junior a second time and kills him. He sends Nancy away on her car, promising to join her soon. Knowing that Senator Roark will never stop hunting them, Hartigan commits suicide to ensure Nancy's safety.

"The Customer Is Always Right (Part II)"
An injured Becky departs from a hospital, talking on a cell phone with her mother. In the elevator she encounters The Salesman, dressed as a doctor. He offers her a cigarette, calling her by name, and she abruptly ends the call with her mother.

Cast 

Frank Miller makes a cameo appearance as a priest, while Robert Rodriguez makes a cameo appearance as a member of the SWAT team.

Production

Filming 

Principal photography began on March 29, 2004. Several of the scenes were shot before any actor had signed on; as a result, several stand-ins were used before the actual actors were digitally added into the film during post-production. Rodriguez, an aficionado of cinematic technology, has used similar techniques in the past. In Roger Ebert's review of the film, he recalled Rodriguez's speech during production of Spy Kids 2: The Island of Lost Dreams: "This is the future! You don't wait six hours for a scene to be lighted. You want a light over here, you grab a light and put it over here. You want a nuclear submarine, you make one out of thin air and put your characters into it."

The film was noted throughout production for Rodriguez's plan to stay faithful to the source material, unlike most other comic book adaptations. Rodriguez stated that he considered the film to be "less of an adaptation than a translation". As a result, there is no screenwriting in the credits; simply "Based on the graphic novels by Frank Miller". There were several minor changes, such as dialogue trimming, new colorized objects, removal of some nudity, slightly edited violence, and minor deleted scenes. These scenes were later added in the release of the Sin City Collectors DVD, which also split the books into four separate stories.

Music 

The soundtrack was composed by Rodriguez, John Debney, and Graeme Revell. The film's three main stories were each scored by an individual composer: Revell scored "The Hard Goodbye", Debney scored "The Big Fat Kill", and Rodriguez scored "That Yellow Bastard". Additionally, Rodriguez co-scored with the other two composers on several tracks.

Another notable piece of music used was the instrumental version of the song "Cells" by the London-based alternative group The Servant. The song was heavily featured in the film's publicity, including the promotional trailers and television spots, and being featured on the film's DVD menus.

"Sensemayá" by Silvestre Revueltas is also used on the end sequence of "That Yellow Bastard". Fluke's track "Absurd" is also used when Hartigan first enters Kadie's.

Credits 
Three directors received credit for Sin City: Miller, Rodriguez, and Quentin Tarantino, the last for directing the drive-to-the-pits scene in which Dwight talks with a dead Jack Rafferty (Benicio del Toro). Miller and Rodriguez worked as a team directing the rest of the film.

When the Directors Guild of America refused to allow two directors that were not an established team to be credited (especially since Miller had never directed before), Rodriguez first planned to give Miller full credit. Miller would not accept this. Rodriguez, also refusing to take full credit, decided to resign from the Guild so that the joint credit could remain.

Release

Home media
The film was released on DVD and VHS on August 16, 2005. Buena Vista Home Entertainment released a two-disc Blu-ray version with DTS-HD Master Audio, which includes a theatrical and extended, unrated, recut of 147 minutes, on April 21, 2009.

Critical reception  
Sin City opened on April 1, 2005, to generally positive reviews. On the review aggregator Rotten Tomatoes, the film holds an approval rating of 77% based on 254 reviews, with an average rating of 7.50/10. The website's critical consensus reads: "Visually groundbreaking and terrifically violent, Sin City brings the dark world of Frank Miller's graphic novel to vivid life." On Metacritic the film has a score of 74 (citing "generally favorable reviews") based on 40 reviews. A 2017 data analysis of Metacritic reviews by Gizmodo UK found Sin City to be the third most critically divisive film of recent years. Audiences polled by CinemaScore gave the film an average grade of "B" on an A+ to F scale.

Roger Ebert awarded the film four out of four stars, describing it as "a visualization of the pulp noir imagination, uncompromising and extreme. Yes, and brilliant." Online critical reaction was particularly strong: James Berardinelli placed the film on his list of the "Top Ten" films of 2005. Chauncey Mabe of the Sun-Sentinel wrote: "Really, there will be no reason for anyone to make a comic-book film ever again. Miller and Rodriguez have pushed the form as far as it can possibly go."

Some reviews focused predominantly on the film's more graphic content, criticizing it for a lack of "humanity", the overwhelmingly dominant themes of violence against women, typically of an exploitative or sexualized nature. William Arnold of the Seattle Post-Intelligencer described it as a celebration of "helpless people being tortured" and "a disturbing gorefest".

The New York Times critic Manohla Dargis gave credit for Rodriguez's "scrupulous care and obvious love for its genre influences", but noted that "it's a shame the movie is kind of a bore" because the director's vision seems to prevail on the intensity of reading a graphic novel.

In a more lighthearted piece focusing on the progression of films and the origins of Sin City, fellow Times critic A. O. Scott, identifying Who Framed Roger Rabbit as its chief cinematic predecessor, argued that "Something is missing – something human. Don't let the movies fool you: Roger Rabbit was guilty," with regard to the increasing use of digitisation within films to replace the human elements. He applauds the fact Rodriguez "has rendered a gorgeous world of silvery shadows that updates the expressionist cinematography of postwar noir" but bemoans that several elements of "old film noirs has been digitally broomed away", resulting instead in a film that "offers sensation without feeling, death without grief, sin without guilt, and, ultimately, novelty without surprise".

Sin City is described as a neo-noir film by some authors.

Box office 
Sin City grossed $29.1 million on its opening weekend in first place, defeating fellow opener Beauty Shop by more than twice its opening take. The film saw a sharp decline in its second weekend, dropping over 50%. Ultimately, the film ended its North American run with a gross of $74.1 million against its $40 million negative cost. Overseas, the film grossed $84.6 million, for a worldwide total from theater receipts of $158.7 million.

Accolades 
Mickey Rourke won a Saturn Award, an Online Film Critics Society Award, a Chicago Film Critics Association Award, and an Irish Film & Television Award for his performance. The film also won the Saturn Awards for Best Action Film and Best DVD Special Edition Release. It was also in competition for the Palme d'Or at the 2005 Cannes Film Festival, and Rodriguez won the Technical Grand Prize for the film's visual shaping. Graeme Revell's work in the film was honored with a Best Film Music Award at the BMI Film & TV Awards.

Sin City was nominated at the 2006 MTV Movie Awards in three categories: Best Movie, Best Kiss for Clive Owen and Rosario Dawson, and Sexiest Performance for Jessica Alba, winning the latter. The film also received three nominations at the 2005 Teen Choice Awards: Choice Action Movie, Choice Action Movie Actress for Jessica Alba and Choice Movie Villain for Elijah Wood.

Sequel 

A sequel, Sin City: A Dame to Kill For, was released on August 22, 2014. Production for the sequel began in October 2012 with Robert Rodriguez and Frank Miller directing a script co-written by them and William Monahan. The film was based mainly on A Dame to Kill For, the second book in the Sin City series by Miller, and also included the short story "Just Another Saturday Night" from the Booze, Broads, & Bullets collection, as well as two original stories written by Miller for the film, titled "The Long Bad Night" and "Nancy's Last Dance". Actors Bruce Willis, Mickey Rourke, Rosario Dawson and Jessica Alba all reprised their roles in the sequel, amongst others. Unlike the 2005 original, the sequel was a critical and financial failure.

TV series 
Dimension Films is developing a soft reboot of the series for television, Stephen L'Heureux who produced the second film will oversee the series with Sin City creator Frank Miller. This will be with new characters and timelines and be more like the comics rather than the films. In November 2019, Deadline reports that Legendary Pictures bought the rights for the television series and are developing both a live action and animated series of Sin City with both Miller and Rodriguez in talks to work on the series as executive producers.

See also 
 List of films based on crime books

References

External links

 
 
 
 
 
 

2005 films
2005 LGBT-related films
2000s crime thriller films
2000s crime action films
2005 action thriller films
2000s thriller films
American action thriller films
American crime action films
American crime thriller films
2000s English-language films
American anthology films
American black-and-white films
American LGBT-related films
Lesbian-related films
Films about cannibalism
Films about pedophilia
American films about revenge
Films about suicide
Films set in prison
American neo-noir films
American nonlinear narrative films
Sin City
American vigilante films
Troublemaker Studios films
Films scored by John Debney
Films scored by Graeme Revell
Films scored by Robert Rodriguez
Films based on Dark Horse Comics
Films based on works by Frank Miller
Films directed by Frank Miller (comics)
Films directed by Robert Rodriguez
Films directed by Quentin Tarantino
Films produced by Elizabeth Avellán
Films produced by Robert Rodriguez
Films set in the United States
Films shot in Austin, Texas
Live-action films based on comics
Films with screenplays by Frank Miller (comics)
Miramax films
Dimension Films films
Films about police misconduct
American rape and revenge films
2000s vigilante films
2005 directorial debut films
Hyperlink films
2000s American films